The Defence Nuclear Organisation (DNO) is one of the seven top level budget holders within the United Kingdom's Ministry of Defence. The organisation was formed in 2016, in order to oversee the MoD's nuclear enterprise.

Functions
The Defence Nuclear Organisation primarily serves to oversee the Ministry of Defence's Defence Nuclear Enterprise, that is the people, equipment, and the infrastructure all working together to provide the United Kingdom's continuous at sea deterrent. This includes, the scientific research surrounding the nuclear program, the delivery of nuclear warheads, providing appropriate infrastructure for the program, and disposing of nuclear assets.

Primarily based at the organisation's headquarters in the MoD Main Building in Whitehall, the over 300 staff are also based at MoD Abbey Wood in Bristol, RNAD Coulport in Argyll, and the Atomic Weapons Establishment near Reading.

References

External links
 Official website

 

Nuclear weapons programme of the United Kingdom
Trident (UK nuclear programme)
Defence agencies of the United Kingdom
Organizations established in 2016
2016 establishments in the United Kingdom
Government agencies established in 2016